This page lists board and card games, wargames, miniatures games, and tabletop role-playing games published in 1995.  For video games, see 1995 in video gaming.

Games released or invented in 1995

Game awards given in 1995
 Spiel des Jahres: The Settlers of Catan
 Games: Sharp Shooters

Deaths

See also
 1995 in video gaming

Games
Games by year